Matt Lincoln is an American medical drama series which aired on ABC as part of its 1970-71 lineup.

Based on a Universal made-for-tv movie called Dial Hot Line, Matt Lincoln starred Vince Edwards (best known as the lead in Ben Casey a few years earlier) as Dr. Matt Lincoln, a "community psychiatrist" who had founded a telephone hotline for troubled teenagers.  He also operated a free walk-in clinic to help the needy with their mental health concerns, in addition to a private practice which apparently paid the bills for the other two endeavors. Community psychiatrist Dr. D.F. Muhich was a model for the Lincoln character as well as a consultant on the TV show. At the helpline, Matt was assisted by Tag (Chelsea Brown) and Jimmy (Felton Perry), two "hip" young blacks; Ann (June Harding), an attractive young white woman, and Kevin, a somewhat cynical police officer. Dean Jagger played Matt’s father Dr. Lincoln, Sr.

The show's theme tune, "Hey, Who Really Cares" was written by Oliver Nelson and Linda Perhacs, and performed by God's Children, a band formed by Ray Jimenez and Willie Garcia, previously members of Thee Midniters. A full-length version of their recording under the title "Hey, Does Somebody Care" was issued as a single, while the original song appears on Perhacs' legendary album Parallelograms.

History
Media critic Harlan Ellison analyzed this show in his column for the Los Angeles Free Press, reprinted in his anthology The Other Glass Teat. The original made-for-TV film, Dial Hot Line, had a social worker called David Leopold, also played by Edwards. Ellison asked executive producer Irving Elman about the name change, and was told that there'd been a number of jokes about it and references to the Leopold and Loeb murder case. Elman was afraid viewers would make the same connection. Subsequent to this interview, Ellison said he received a letter from a Minneapolis hotline worker, Martha Rosen. She described unrealistic, authoritarian portrayals in Dial Hot Line that might damage the credibility of real hotlines, both with the people who needed them, and with parents and authorities.

Ellison also reprinted sections from Elman's prospectus focusing on Edwards' character, described as an example of "the new breed" of mental health professionals, serving "the many, rather than the few" and involved in a wide array of volunteer activities, somehow managing to earn enough to drive a Mustang, have a Marina apartment and a sailboat. Ellison pointed out "the dichotomy between Matt Lincoln's professional pursuits, dealing with the broken, the twisted, the poor, and the deprived, and his status symbols of the Establishment."

Unlike Edwards' previous medical drama, Matt Lincoln never developed much of an audience and was cancelled at midseason.

Episodes

References

Brooks, Tim and Marsh, Earle, The Complete Directory to Prime Time Network and Cable TV Shows

External links
 

American Broadcasting Company original programming
1970s American drama television series
1970s American medical television series
1970 American television series debuts
1971 American television series endings
English-language television shows
Television series by Universal Television
Television shows set in Los Angeles